Pywackia is a contentious Cambrian fossil that has been interpreted as the earliest (total group) Bryozoan, and the only representative of that phylum in the Cambrian period.
Its Bryozoan credentials have been called into question, but the octocoral alternative is equally unconvincing, and there are reasons to suggest a position in the Stenolaemata stem lineage.

References 

Fossils of Mexico
Enigmatic prehistoric animal genera
Cambrian invertebrates
Cambrian fossil record
Fossil taxa described in 2010
Cambrian genus extinctions